Palanga City Municipality is a city municipality of Lithuania, located in the west of the country, near the Baltic sea. It includes Šventoji, Nemirseta, Būtingė and other settlements. It is located in Klaipėda County, which is no longer an administrative entity, but only used for statistics.

History 
Since 1970 most of Šventoji surroundings added to Palanga municipality. Municipality in current form created in 1995.

Elderships 
A single eldership within municipality – Šventoji eldership, located in Šventoji, 14 km north of Palanga.

Settlements
 Būtingė
 Nemirseta
 Palanga - city proper
 Šventoji

External links
 Official website

 
Municipalities of Lithuania